The Nokia E7-00, also known as Nokia E7, is a business-oriented QWERTY smartphone by Nokia from the Nokia Eseries. It was announced at Nokia World in September 2010 together with the Nokia C6-01 and Nokia C7 and started shipping in February 2011. It is the second phone after the Nokia N8 to be running the Symbian^3 operating system.

When compared with the Nokia N8, it has fixed mass storage of 16GB without a memory card slot, no FM transmitter and a less advanced camera, with Extended Depth of Field, instead of autofocus as in the N8 and the E90. Like the Nokia N8, it comes with an HDMI-out connector and a non-user-replaceable battery that is smaller than the E90's.

It has the same keyboard spring mechanism as the Nokia N97 mini, but has like the N8 an anodized aluminium casing. All this is different from the bulkier and heavier E90.

Compared to the Nokia N97 mini and E90, the E7-00 has a multitouch capacitive touchscreen. Unlike the N8, N97 mini, and the E90, the E7-00 has an Active-matrix OLED (AMOLED) ClearBlack technology with a slightly lower resolution than the E90.
Vlasta Berka, general manager of Nokia Singapore, Malaysia and Brunei, talked about the trend of users who are using their smartphones for business.

Design

Dimensions 
 Size: 
 Weight (with battery): 
 Volume:

Keys and input methods 
 Full QWERTY keyboard
 Home key, power key, lock key, camera key, volume key
 Finger touch support for text input and UI control
 On-screen alphanumeric keypad and full keyboard
 Possibility to use capacitive stylus
 Full screen handwriting recognition
 Handwriting recognition for Chinese

Appearance 
Anodised aluminium casing available in dark grey, silver white, blue, green and orange

Display and user interface 
 Screen size: 4"
 Resolution: 16:9 VGA(640 × 360 pixels) AMOLED
 16 million colours
 Capacitive touch screen
 Orientation sensor (Accelerometer)
 Compass (Magnetometer)
 Proximity sensor
 Ambient light detector

Personalisation 
 Up to three customisable home screens: menu, widgets, themes, shortcuts, icons, customisable profiles (with an update of Symbian Belle you got a six home screens with some new and enlarged widgets)
 Ringtones: MP3, AAC, eAAC, eAAC+, WMA, AMR-NB, AMR-WB
 Video ringtones
 Themes: wallpapers, screensavers, audio themes & pre-installed themes
 Changeable colour themes

Hardware

Power management 
 BL-4D 1,200 mAh Li-Ion battery
 Talk time (maximum):
 GSM up to 540 mins (9 h)
 WCDMA up to 300 mins (5 h)
 Standby time (maximum):
 GSM up to 430 h (17 d, 22 h)
 WCDMA up to 470 h (19 d, 14 h)
 Charging port:
 Micro-USB

Data network 
 GPRS/EDGE class B, multislot class 33
 HSDPA Cat9, maximum speed up to 10.2 Mbit/s, HSUPA Cat5 2.0 Mbit/s
 WLAN IEEE 802.11 b/g/n
 Capability to serve as data modem
 Support for Microsoft Outlook synchronisation of contacts, calendar and notes

Memory 
 Internal memory: 16 GB, not expandable.

Operating frequency 
 GSM/EDGE 850/900/1800/1900
 WCDMA 850/900/1700/1900/2100
 Automatic switching between WCDMA and GSM bands
 Flight mode

Connectivity 
 Bluetooth 3.0
 HDMI
 High-Speed USB 2.0 (micro USB connector)
 Micro-USB connector and charging
 USB On-the-Go
 Standard 3.5 mm AV connector
 FM Radio
 Built-in wireless b/g/n connectivity adapter

Criticism
The Parliament of Finland bought 200 E7s in spring 2011; by late April 2012, over 50 of these phones had been serviced under warranty. Most of them were fixed by OS update 

The E7's battery is not user-removable, although unofficial online tutorials on how to replace the battery exist.

Being one of Nokia's first phone designs without a dedicated connector for charging, the USB connector in the E7 is also used for charging, and is a common point of failure.

References

External links

 Nokia E7-00 official product page
 Nokia E7-00 Device details at Forum Nokia

Mobile phones with an integrated hardware keyboard
Mobile phones introduced in 2010
Nokia ESeries
Slider phones